The Foster/Bell House is an historic building located in Ottumwa, Iowa, United States. The original house on the property was the home of Judge H.B. Hendershott built in 1862. He sold the property to Thomas D. Foster in early 1890s. He was the chairman and general manager of the meat packing firm John Morrell & Company from 1893 to 1915. Foster hired architect Ernest Koch to design the present residence. It was originally a frame and stone house in the Neoclassical style that was completed in 1893. The house passed to Foster's daughter Ellen Foster Bell who hired the Des Moines architectural firm of Kraetsch and Kraetsch. They redesigned the exterior to its present Tudor Revival style in 1923. The architectural firm of Tinsley, McBroom & Higgins made significant changes to the interior in 1929. It features Sioux Falls red granite on the main floor.

The house's historical significance is derived from its Tudor Revival architecture realized on a large scale. Its association with Thomas Foster is negated by the building's 1923 remodeling. The property was individually listed on the National Register of Historic Places in 1983. It was included as a contributing property in the Fifth Street Bluff Historic District in 1998.

References

Houses completed in 1893
Buildings and structures in Ottumwa, Iowa
Houses in Wapello County, Iowa
Tudor Revival architecture in Iowa
Houses on the National Register of Historic Places in Iowa
National Register of Historic Places in Wapello County, Iowa
Individually listed contributing properties to historic districts on the National Register in Iowa